Spread Eagle  is an American hard rock band from New York City. After only a few months of formation, they were signed by MCA/Universal Records. They have released three albums: Spread Eagle (1990),  Open To The Public (1993) and Subway To The Stars (2019).

Spread Eagle's bassist Rob De Luca is also a member of British rock band UFO.

Biography

Early years
In the 1980s, founding members Paul DiBartolo, Rob De Luca and Tommi Gallo were playing in the Boston-based hard rock band Bang. In September 1986, Bang won the MTV Basement Tapes competition with the video for their song "Summertime".

In 1989 guitarist Paul Di Bartolo (a.k.a. Salvadore Poe) traveled to New York City where he met singer Ray West. Paul was so impressed by his voice, that he immediately convinced bassist Rob De Luca and drummer Tommi Gallo to follow him to New York and start a new band with Ray, which became Spread Eagle.

After only a few months of rehearsing they signed with MCA/Universal Records.

Spread Eagle
As they were signed while still rehearsing for their first gig, they wrote most songs for their 1990 debut album Spread Eagle in the recording studio. Receiving little promotion from MCA, the band produced the video for "Scratch Like A Cat" using their own money and with the help of friends.

Open To The Public
The band spent a lot of time on the road before recording their follow-up album and began burning out. First to leave was drummer Tommi Gallo. He was replaced by Kirke Blankenship who did not stay for long and played drums on one track (High Horses) of the second album Open To The Public. That album was then recorded with session drummers John Macaluso from TNT and Thommy Price from Joan Jett and the Blackhearts. Open to the Public was released in 1993. Dave Femia played the drums on the following tour. Gallo then returned but quit after a US tour. The new record did not meet the expectations of their fans and grunge took over the music scene. So in 1995 Spread Eagle resigned and split up.

Post Spread Eagle
Ray West turned his back on the music business for a while. He is also singing in a band called Weapons Of Anew.

Paul DiBartolo changed his name to Salvadore Poe and wrote/recorded songs for Swedish singer Lisa Ekdahl who was his wife at that time. He is fascinated by Indian culture and spends much of his time there.

Rob De Luca started new bands called Ouijipig, and OF EARTH. He has also worked as studio bassist and touring bassist for many bands including UFO, Sebastian Bach, Joan Jett and the Blackhearts, Helmet, George Lynch and Vinnie Moore.

Tommi Gallo is a member of the band Iron Rage and formerly of Bang. Tommi is a talented artist who designed the Spread Eagle debut album cover. He lives, plays and paints in Worcester, MA.

2006 Reunion
In 2006 Spread Eagle's debut album Spread Eagle, which had been out of print for 10 years, was remastered and re-released by the independent label Lovember Records. At the same time Rob De Luca and Ray West reformed the band, announcing the 2006 "Back On The Bitch Tour" of northeastern USA.
When guitarist Ziv Shalev joined in 2012, the band finally had a stable line-up, along with drummer Rik De Luca, who joined in 2010 and the two founding members Ray West (vocals) and Rob De Luca (bass, vocals).

Recent
In 2017 Spread Eagle confirmed several tour dates in Europe, including the Hull Metal Heaven and HRH Sleaze festivals. Following their UK/EU 2017 tour, they signed to Frontiers Music SRL and started writing and recording. Their latest album Subway To The Stars was released on August 9, 2019. The music video for the first single "Sound Of Speed" features the band members in a go-kart race with an unexpected ending. It was filmed in the Poconos in Pennsylvania and directed by Phil Allocco (The Truth About Lies).

Australian drag racing team West Coast Pro Modifieds chose "Sound of Speed" as their official song for the 2019/2020 racing season. The Australian Spread Eagle fan club honored this by creating a "Pro Mod Edit" of the video, where the go-kart race sequences were replaced with real drag racing footages.
Subway To The Stars was included in many best of 2019 polls, including the Top 5 hard rock releases on Ultimate Guitar and Top 20 albums of 2019 in both the Sleaze Roxx readers' voting | and The Rock Pit Australia.
In July 2020 Spread Eagle released a lyric video for the track "More Wolf Than Lamb".

Band members

Current
Ray West - lead vocals, tambourine (1989–1995, 2006–present)
Rob De Luca - bass, vocals (1989–1995, 2006–present)
Ziv Shalev - guitar (2012–present) 
Rik De Luca - drums (2010–present)

Former
Paul DiBartolo (Salvadore Poe) - guitar, vocals (1989–1995)
Tommi Gallo - drums (1989–1992)
Dennis Kimak - guitar (2008–2012)

Session
Kirke Blankenship - drums (1992)
John Macaluso - drums (1992-1993)
Thommy Price - drums (1992-1993)

Tour members
Dave Femia - drums (1993)
John Macaluso - drums (2006)
Chris Caffery - guitar (2006)
Gerry White - drums (2008)
Gianmaria "Jommy" Puledda - guitar (2022)

Discography

References

External links
Spread Eagle Official Page

Frontiers Records artists
Glam metal musical groups from New York (state)
Hard rock musical groups from New York (state)
Heavy metal musical groups from New York (state)
MCA Records artists
Musical groups established in 1989
Musical groups disestablished in 1995
Musical groups from New York City